James Anderson Croal (27 July 1885 – 16 September 1939) was a Scottish footballer, who played for Falkirk, Rangers, Chelsea and Scotland. He was judged to be a clever inside left who when paired with Bob McNeil was very effective.

Career
Croal was a lively inside left, who joined Rangers in 1905 from junior football. However, he failed to make the breakthrough to the first team and went out on loan to Ayr Parkhouse, Alloa Athletic and Dunfermline Athletic, before finally leaving Ibrox to sign for Falkirk for a £10 fee in November 1910. At Brockville, his career blossomed, and he won the Scottish Cup in 1913, as well as three international caps for Scotland and five appearances for the Scottish League XI. Croal transferred to Chelsea from Falkirk sometime in 1914. Chelsea paid £2,000 for him and he remained at Stamford Bridge until 1922. He was a member of the Chelsea side that reached the 1915 FA Cup Final. He made a total of 130 appearances for Chelsea, scoring a total of 26 goals. Croal then spent two-and-a-half seasons with Fulham before retiring.

Personal life 
Croal was a schoolmaster by profession. In the summer of 1916, two years since the outbreak of the First World War, he enlisted as a private in the King's Royal Rifle Corps. By March 1918 he had risen to the rank of corporal and finished the war as an acting sergeant.

Honours
Falkirk
Scottish Cup: 1912–13

References

External links 

 

1885 births
1939 deaths
Scottish footballers
Scotland international footballers
Chelsea F.C. players
Falkirk F.C. players
Rangers F.C. players
Dunfermline Athletic F.C. wartime guest players
Association football inside forwards
Scottish Football League players
Scottish Football League representative players
English Football League players
Footballers from Glasgow
British Army personnel of World War I
King's Royal Rifle Corps soldiers
Ayr Parkhouse F.C. players
Alloa Athletic F.C. players
Fulham F.C. players
Falkirk F.C. wartime guest players
Dunfermline Athletic F.C. players
Scottish Junior Football Association players
Scotland junior international footballers
People from Gorbals
FA Cup Final players